Edith Charlotte Ottosen (June 18, 1928 – January 17, 1990) was a Norwegian actress.

Ottosen was born in Levanger, Norway. She grew up in Copenhagen, and in 1951 she debuted at the Aarhus Theater. From 1954 to 1984, she was engaged with the Rogaland Theater, where she was a driving force and played a wide repertoire, including Evelinde in Arne Garborg's Læraren, Elmire in Molière's Tartuffe, Maria in Anton Chekhov's Uncle Vanya, and the locally popular Bertine in Leiv Isaksen's Maktå på Straen.

Filmography
1954: Heksenetter as a woman in a nightclub
1958: I slik en natt as an informer
1974: Kimen as Åshild

References

External links
 
 Edith Ottosen at Sceneweb
 Edith Ottosen at Filmfront

1928 births
1990 deaths
20th-century Norwegian actresses
People from Levanger